Kenny was an English pop, rock and glam rock band that formed in London in 1974. They had several hit singles in the UK in the mid-1970s, including "The Bump" and "Fancy Pants".

History
In 1973, Irish showband singer Tony Kenny, former lead singer with The Sands and The Vampires, recorded a single, "Heart of Stone", written by Bill Martin and Phil Coulter, and produced by Mickie Most. It was released under the name Kenny, and, after the singer returned to Ireland, the single became a hit in Britain, as did a follow-up release, "Give It to Me Now".

Most then decided to capitalise on their success by renaming a completely unconnected Enfield band named Chuff, as Kenny. Former child actor Keith Chegwin was considered as lead singer but he declined. Martin and Coulter wrote the bulk of the successful songs for the group, starting with "The Bump", which reached the Top 3 in the UK Singles Chart. They had three further records reach that chart in the UK: "Fancy Pants", "Baby I Love You, OK!", and "Julie Anne". The band were at one stage managed by John Morris, the husband of singer Clodagh Rodgers.

Uncredited lead and backing vocals on "The Bump" were performed by Barry Palmer.

In 1989, lead singer Rick Driscoll played lead guitar for Steve Harley and Cockney Rebel as part of Steve Harley's comeback tour, aptly named "The Come Back, All Is Forgiven Tour". The show at Northampton's Derngate Theatre in June 1989 was released on DVD later that year. Driscoll was replaced by Robbie Gladwell in 1990, who as of 2021 continues to play lead guitar in the band. In 1996, Driscoll also appeared on the 'Identity Parade', on the BBC Television programme Never Mind the Buzzcocks. As of 2021 he is based in Corfu, where he skippers charter yachts.

Members

Rick Driscoll — vocals, guitar, born 1 May 1957 in Enfield
Yan Stile (born Ian Stile) — guitar, born 16 January 1955 in Enfield
Chris Redburn — bass, born 14 March 1956 in Enfield
Chris Lacklison — keyboards, born 15 October 1956 in London
Andy Walton — drums, born 1 October 1956 in Enfield

Discography

Albums
 1975 - The Sound of Super K (RAK), UK No. 56, GER No. 38
 1976 - Ricochet (Polydor) (Germany/Japan only)

Singles

List of songs recorded by Kenny
The column Song list the song title; bold means released as a single.
The column Writer(s) lists who wrote the song.
The column Time shows its length.
The column Album lists the album the song is featured on.
The column Producer lists the producer of the song.
The column Year lists the year in which the song was released.

Cover songs

Kenny songs covered by others

See also
List of performances on Top of the Pops
Bump (dance)

References

External links
[ Kenny biography] at Allmusic website

English pop music groups
Musical groups established in 1974
Musical groups disestablished in 1979
English glam rock groups
English rock music groups
Rak Records artists
Musical groups from London
1974 establishments in the United Kingdom